The following is a list of players and managers who appeared at least in one game for the original Buffalo Bisons National League franchise from  through .
 1 - Denotes a player on the 1879 original roster
 2 - Denotes the first manager
 3 - Denotes a manager
 4 - Denotes a Hall of Fame member



B
Dan Brouthers4
James Burke

C
Scrappy Carroll
Jack Chapman3
John Clapp1,2
Chub Collins
John Connor
Pete Conway
Ed Coughlin
Ed Crane
Sam Crane3
Bill Crowley1
Ed Cushman

D
Hugh Daily
Dell Darling
George Derby
Buttercup Dickerson
Tom Dolan
Denny Driscoll

E
Dave Eggler1
Bones Ely
Dude Esterbrook

F
John Fischer
Curry Foley
Davy Force1
Chick Fulmer1

G
Pud Galvin1,3,4

H
Art Hagan
Gil Hatfield
Moxie Hengel
Joe Hornung1

K
Tom Kearns
Jim Keenan
Doc Kennedy

L
Arlie Latham
Steve Libby1
Jim Lillie
Jack Lynch

M
Denny Mack
Jack Manning
Jim McCauley
Jim McDonald
Bill McGunnigle1
John Morrissey
Mike Moynahan
George Myers

O
Jim O'Rourke3,4

P
John Peters
Dick Phelan
Tom Poorman
Blondie Purcell

R
Charley Radbourn4
Hardy Richardson1
Charlie Ritter
Jack Rowe1

S
Billy Serad
Orator Shaffer
Pop Smith
Joe Stabell
Dan Stearns
Tony Suck
Sleeper Sullivan
Ed Swartwood

W
Oscar Walker1
Deacon White
Stump Wiedman
Pete Wood

Sources
Baseball Reference

 All Time
Major League Baseball all-time rosters